Mitch Benn's Crimes Against Music is a BBC Radio 4 comedy series, taking a satirical look at popular music. It is written by and stars Mitch Benn and Robin Ince. It also features Mitch's group The Distractions (Kirsty Newton and Tash Baylis) and in the first two series Alfie Joey. It began in 2004, and has run for three series so far.

Format

Series One and Two
The first two series had a discussion format in which, every week, the presenters would talk about some aspect of the music industry, inevitably tying into whatever songs Mitch had prepared (something Robin would comment sarcastically upon). Running gags included regular appearances by Satan (Robin Ince) complaining that heavy metal was getting soft; Robin's obsession with The Smiths and talking head clip shows he had appeared in; Alfie's obsession with Lindisfarne; and, in the first series, Mitch's paranoia that Richard Stilgoe is a better musical satirist.

In both series the final episode was a "format-buster" with a special guest star. The last episode of series one started out as a discussion of manufactured bands, but was derailed when Richard Stilgoe appeared and attempted a coup, with Robin taking his side. The series two finale, Journey to the Centre of Rick Wakeman, a parody of 1970s progressive rock "concept albums", was set in the near future (2009, to be exact), when England and Wales are on the point of war and the Crimes team must reform to bring Rick Wakeman out of a coma so he can bring peace.

Series Three
The third series worked the musical satire into a sitcom format. The concept was that Mitch and Robin were taking the show on tour, but consistently failing to arrive at their destinations and performing wherever they ended up. The first two episodes were set in fictional small towns in Canada and Wales, respectively. In the third they were trapped at London Stansted Airport, trying to get to Australia. This led directly into the final episode, in which their plane crashed on a mysterious island, in a parody of Lost.

Recurring jokes in this series included Morrissey (played by Ince) appearing at some point, and the fact the Distractions were present during the musical numbers, and occasionally referred to, but almost never directly involved in the plot.

Crimes Against Music album
Crimes Against Music is a 2005 album by Mitch Benn and The Distractions named after and featuring songs from the show, as well as The Now Show and It's Been a Bad Week.

"The Curse Of Robin Ince"
Series one made a regular feature of Robin Ince's celebrated impression of the well-loved DJ John Peel. Peel's death in October 2004 required that this feature be dropped for series two; accordingly Ince wrote and recorded a series of sketches using his impression of rock DJ Tommy Vance. By a bizarre quirk of fate, Vance himself died shortly before series two was due to begin broadcasting; Ince had to be hurriedly smuggled into a recording of The Now Show in order to record re-written versions of the Vance sketches in his "Satan" persona, Satan being less vulnerable to The Curse. Ince's John Peel impression was resurrected for the last episode of series two, where he played "The Ghost of John Peel".

External links
 

BBC Radio comedy programmes
BBC Radio 4 programmes
2004 radio programme debuts